Rauhiella is a genus of flowering plants from the orchid family, Orchidaceae. 

It contains three known species, all endemic to Brazil.

Rauhiella brasiliensis Pabst & Braga - Rio de Janeiro
Rauhiella seehaweri (I.Bock) Toscano & Christenson - Rio de Janeiro
Rauhiella silvana Toscano - Rio de Janeiro, Bahia

See also 
 List of Orchidaceae genera

References

External links 

Endemic orchids of Brazil
Oncidiinae genera
Oncidiinae